Day One is a made-for-TV documentary-drama movie about The Manhattan Project, the research and development of the atomic bomb during World War II. It is based on the book by Peter Wyden. The movie was written by David W. Rintels and directed by Joseph Sargent. It starred Brian Dennehy as General Leslie Groves, David Strathairn as Dr. J. Robert Oppenheimer and Michael Tucker as Dr. Leo Szilard. It premiered in the United States on March 5, 1989 on the CBS network. It won the 1989 Emmy award for Outstanding Drama/Comedy Special. The movie received critical acclaim for its historical accuracy despite being a drama.

Plot
When Hungarian physicist Leo Szilard leaves Europe he eventually arrives in the United States where, with the help of Albert Einstein, he persuades the Federal government to build an atomic bomb. General Leslie Groves selects physicist J. Robert Oppenheimer to head the Los Alamos Laboratory in New Mexico, where the bomb is built. As World War II draws to a close, Szilard (whose idea was responsible for the progress made) has second thoughts about atomic weapons and debates how and when to use the bomb.

The film focuses on the organization and the politics of the whole affair, such as tensions between the scientists and the military, the communist affiliation of many scientists around that time,  the (perceived) risks of espionage and the decision whether to use the bomb after Germany is defeated. Concerning the actual scientific work on the bomb, some of it is shown, but not explained, so an understanding of the workings of the bomb is needed to understand what is going on in that respect.

The story starts with Leo Szilard fleeing Germany on the last train out and trying to convince the military that a nuclear bomb can be built and that the Germans are already working on it. In England, his idea is filed and ignored, so he travels to the US, but there too, he has to wait a year until something is done with it and Project Manhattan is started.

As Germany is being defeated and its scientists interrogated, it is found out that they have not even come close to constructing a nuclear bomb (partly due to bad cooperation by scientists). Despite the fact that no one has the technology now, and the original reason for project Manhattan is gone, work continues. Szilard, who first used Einstein to get his ideas about building a bomb across to the US leaders, now convinces him to join him in writing a letter to the president to do the opposite, namely not to build the bomb, in order to avoid an arms race. 68 scientists sign a petition, but that is held back by the military.

U.S. President Truman is faced with four options: peace talks (which would require the Japanese to keep their emperor, as eventually happened), a blockade (which was thought to be cowardly), an invasion (estimated by some to cost up to a million lives, though such numbers have been widely disputed), or dropping the bomb. Another consideration is that the USSR had said they would enter the war against Japan three months after the surrender of Germany and there is a fear that they might not leave. So Truman decides that the best course of action is to drop the bomb on Hiroshima, against the advice of General Eisenhower.

Cast

Production
In order to depict a desert setting, certain scenes of the film were filmed in a town named Notre Dame de Lourdes, located in the province of Quebec. The town offered a wide expanse of sand quarry that was used for filming.

Rival project
The film premiered on television in the same year that another film about the subject, Fat Man and Little Boy, starring Paul Newman as General Groves and Dwight Schultz as J. Robert Oppenheimer, was released to theaters.

See also 

 The Beginning or the End, 1947 docudrama film about The Manhattan Project.

References

External links
 

Films about the Manhattan Project
Films about the atomic bombings of Hiroshima and Nagasaki
Television shows about the atomic bombings of Hiroshima and Nagasaki
Science docudramas
Films directed by Joseph Sargent
Primetime Emmy Award for Outstanding Made for Television Movie winners
CBS network films
1989 television films
1989 films
Films scored by Mason Daring
American docudrama films
American drama television films
1980s American films